The 2020 Vietnamese Women's National League (referred to as the Thai Son Bac Cup for sponsorship reasons) was the 23rd season of Vietnamese Women's National League, a professional women's football league in Vietnam. The season began on 22 September 2020 and finished on 13 December 2020. Defending champions Ho Chi Minh City I won their 9th title, while picking up their first ever domestic double.

The season was set to start in August but was postponed due to the effects of the COVID-19 pandemic.

Teams

Personnel and kits

Managerial changes

League table
<onlyinclude>

Results

Positions by round

Season progress

Schedule 
Details (in Vietnamese): https://vff.org.vn/lich-truyen-hinh-truc-tiep-luot-di-giai-bong-da-nu-vdqg-cup-thai-son-bac-2020/

Season statistics

Top scorers

Hat-tricks 

Notes
4 Player scored 4 goals 
5 Player scored 5 goals

Clean sheets

Awards

Annual awards

See also
 2020 Women's Vietnamese Cup

References

External links
Official Page

Vietnam
2020 in Vietnamese football
Vietnamese Women's Football Championship, 2020